The following lists events that happened during 1954 in French Indochina.

Events

March
 March 13 - French troops begin the battle against the Viet Minh in Dien Bien Phu.
 March 23 - The Viet Minh capture the main airstrip of Dien Bien Phu. The remaining French Army units there are partially isolated.

May
 May 7 - The Battle of Dien Bien Phu ends in a French defeat.

July
 July 21 - The Geneva Conference sends French forces to the south, and Vietnamese forces to the north, of a ceasefire line, and calls for elections to decide the government for all of Vietnam by July 1956. Failure to abide by the terms of the agreement leads to the establishment de facto of regimes of North Vietnam and South Vietnam, and the Vietnam War.

August
 August 1 - The First Indochina War ends with the Vietnam People's Army in North Vietnam, the Vietnamese National Army in South Vietnam, the Kingdom of Cambodia in Cambodia, and the Kingdom of Laos in Laos, emerging victorious against the French Army. French Indochina is now dissolved into said regions.

References

 
Indochina
Years of the 20th century in French Indochina
French Indochina
1950s in French Indochina
French Indochina